The Richardson Store, located off I-40 in Montoya, New Mexico, is a historic Route 66 fixture.  It served tourists and other travelers.  It was listed on the National Register of Historic Places in 1978.

The store was started by G.W. Richardson in 1908, in a wooden structure.  In 1918, he relocated the store to the red sandstone building that survives today, while the state of New Mexico improved the roadway.  The roadway became part of the famous Route 66.  The store thrived in the 1920s, 1930s, and 1940s.

Interstate 40 came through, a few hundred yards to the south, in 1956.  Although there is an exit, the speed of traffic greatly reduced stops, and the store and Montoya declined.  The store eventually closed and has been vacant for many years. In 2014, the building's roof collapsed.

See also

National Register of Historic Places listings in Quay County, New Mexico

References

External links

Commercial buildings on the National Register of Historic Places in New Mexico
Commercial buildings completed in 1928
Buildings and structures in Quay County, New Mexico
U.S. Route 66 in New Mexico
1928 establishments in New Mexico
National Register of Historic Places in Quay County, New Mexico